Santa Barbara Condors was an American soccer club that was a member of the American Soccer League.

The club folded halfway through their only season.

Year-by-year

References

Defunct soccer clubs in California
Sports in Santa Barbara, California
American Soccer League (1933–1983) teams
1977 establishments in California
1977 disestablishments in California
Association football clubs established in 1977
Association football clubs disestablished in 1977